The following outline is provided as an overview of and topical guide to sculpture:

A sculpture – human-made three-dimensional art object.

Sculpture or sculpting – activity of creating sculptures.  A person who creates sculptures is called a sculptor.

What type of thing is sculpture? 
Sculpture can be described as all of the following:

 Art – aesthetic expression for presentation or performance, and the work produced from this activity. The word "art" is therefore both a verb and a noun, as is the term "sculpture".
 Work of art – aesthetic physical item or artistic creation.
 One of the arts – as an art form, sculpture is an outlet of human expression, that is usually influenced by culture and which in turn helps to change culture. Sculpture is a physical manifestation of the internal human creative impulse.
 A branch of the visual arts – visual arts is a class of art forms, including painting, sculpture, photography, architecture and others, that focus on the creation of works which are primarily visual in nature.
 Fine art – in Western European academic traditions, fine art is art developed primarily for aesthetics, distinguishing it from applied art that also has to serve some practical function. The word "fine" here does not so much denote the quality of the artwork in question, but the purity of the discipline according to traditional Western European canons.

Types of sculpture

 Architectural sculpture –
 Assemblage –
 Bas relief  –
 Bust –
 Earth art –
 Environmental sculpture –
 Figurine –
 Installation art –
 Kinetic sculpture –
 Mobile –
 Statue –

Short-lived forms
 Gas sculpture
 Ice sculpture
 Rock balancing
 Sand sculpture

Styles of sculpture
 Detonography –
 Modern sculpture –
 Relief –

History of sculpture

History of sculpture

Elements 
 Mass –
 Negative space –
 Space –
 Volume –

General sculpture concepts

Armature –
 Carving –
Casting –
Chisel –
 Direct carving –
 Maquette –
Model –
Nude –
Readymade –
Relief sculpture –
Patina –

Materials used in sculpture

Traditional Materials

 Wood –
 Marble –
 Limestone –
 Granite –
 Porphyry –
 Diorite –
 Jade –
 Ivory –
 Clay –
 Terracotta –
 Bronze –
 Gold –
 Silver –
 Butter  –
 Soapstone  –

Modern Materials

 Steel –
 Jesmonite –
 Acrylic –
 Concrete
 Plastic –
 Fiberglass –
 Glass –
 Aluminum –
 Fabric –
 Paper –
 Found object –

Notable works of sculpture

 Great Sphinx of Giza (c. 2558–2532 BCE)
 Abu Simbel temples (c. 1264 BCE)
 Elgin Marbles from the Parthenon (438 BCE)
 Colossus of Rhodes (c. 292 BCE)
 Winged Victory of Samothrace (c. 2nd century BCE)
 Terracotta Army (246–210 BCE) 
 Laocoön and His Sons (c. 200 BCE-70 CE)
 Venus de Milo (130–100 BCE)
 Equestrian Statue of Marcus Aurelius (175 CE)
 Buddhas of Bamiyan (507–554 CE)
 Chartes Cathedral (c. 1194–1250 CE)
 Konark Sun Temple (1250 CE)
 Moai, Easter Islands (1250–1500 CE)
 Pietà (1498–1499)
 David (1501–1504)
 Kamagaya Great Buddha (1776)
 Nelson's Column (1843)
 Adams Memorial (1881)
 Liberty Enlightening the World, Statue of Liberty (1886)
 The Gates of Hell (1890–1917)
 The Thinker (1904)
 Mount Rushmore (1927–1941)
 Christ the Redeemer (1927–1931)
 The Motherland Calls (1967)
 Mother Motherland, Kiev (1981)
 Genghis Khan Equestrian Statue (2008)

Selected sculptors

Antiquity to the  19th century

 Agesander of Rhodes –
 Antonio Canova –
 Baccio da Montelupo –
 Bartolommeo Bandinelli –
 Benedetto da Maiano –
 Benvenuto Cellini –
 Bertoldo di Giovanni –
 Domenico Rosselli –
 Donatello –
 Giambologna –
 Gian Lorenzo Bernini –
 Giovanni Francesco Rustici –
 Giovanni Pisano –
 Jean-Antoine Houdon –
 Kresilas –
 Michelangelo –
 Myron –
 Nicola Pisano –
 Phidias –
 Pietro di Francesco degli Orioli –
 Polykleitos –
 Raffaello da Montelupo –

19th to 20th century (Modern)

 Adolf von Hildebrand –
 Alberto Giacometti –
 Alexander Calder –
Alexander Rodchenko –
 Antoine Bourdelle –
 Aristide Maillol –
 Auguste Rodin –
 Barbara Hepworth –
 Camille Claudel –
 Chaim Gross –
 Charles Despiau –
 Constantin Brâncuși –
 David Smith –
 Ernst Barlach –
 François Pompon –
 Frederick John Kiesler –
 Gaston Lachaise –
 Germaine Richier –
 Giacomo Manzù –
 Henri Matisse –
 Henry Moore –
 Isamu Noguchi –
 Jacob Epstein –
 Jacques Lipchitz –
 Jean/Hans Arp –
 Jean Dubuffet –
 Joan Miró –
 Jose de Creeft –
 Julio González –
 Kurt Schwitters –
 Louise Berliawsky Nevelson –
 Lucio Fontana –
 Marino Marini –
 Max Ernst –
 Medardo Rosso –
 Naum Gabo –
 Pablo Picasso –
 Pablo Serrano –
 Umberto Boccioni –
 Vladimir Tatlin –

Contemporary

 Alice Aycock –
 Anthony Caro –
 Barry Flanagan –
 Beverly Pepper –
 Bill Barrett –
 Bruce Nauman –
 César Baldaccini –
 Charles Ginnever –
 Claes Oldenburg –
 Clement Meadmore –
 Dan Flavin –
 Donald Judd –
 Eduardo Chillida –
 Ellsworth Kelly –
 Eva Hesse –
 Fernando Botero –
 Frank Stella –
 George Segal –
 Isaac Witkin –
 James Rosati –
 Jean Tinguely –
 Joel Shapiro –
 John Chamberlain –
 John Raymond Henry –
 Joseph Beuys –
 Kenneth Snelson –
 Leonard Baskin –
 Louise Bourgeois –
 Lyman Kipp –
 Marisol Escobar –
 Mark di Suvero –
 Martin Puryear –
 Michael Heizer –
 Nam June Paik  –
 Nancy Graves –
 Niki de Saint Phalle  –
 Peter Reginato –
 Rebecca Horn –
 Richard Long –
 Richard Serra –
 Robert H. Hudson –
 Robert Morris –
 Robert Smithson –
 Tony Cragg –
 Tony Rosenthal –
 Tony Smith –
 Vito Acconci –
 William G. Tucker –
 Wolf Vostell  –

Arts similar to sculpture 

 Bone carving –
 Butter sculpture –
 Collage –
 Costuming –
 Doll making –
 Dynamic textures –
 Earth Art –
 Floral design –
 Ikebana –
 Glassblowing –
 Hologram –
 Ice carving –
 Ivory carving –
 Mask –
 Mosaics –
 Origami –
 Pottery –
 Pumpkin carving –
 Sand sculpture –
 Sugar sculpture –
 Wood carving –
 Wrought iron –

See also

 List of most expensive sculptures

External links

1200 Years of Italian Sculpture ( mostly in Italian)
 Masters of 20th Century Figure Sculpture
Essays on sculpture from Sweet Briar College, Department of Art History
International Sculpture Center
Sculpture artists listings from the-artists.org
 

Sculpture
Sculpture
 1
Sculpture
Sculpture